Hezarkhusheh (also Romanized as Hezārkhūsheh) is a village in Bala Khaf Rural District, Salami District, Khaf County, Razavi Khorasan Province, Iran. At the 2006 census, its population was 502, in 116 families.

References 

Populated places in Khaf County